The anti-jock movement is a loosely organized cyber-movement consisting of similarly themed websites, whose goal is to challenge the perceived cultural dominance of institutionalized competitive sports and to raise issues of the perceived detrimental effects of such a dominance. In this regard, the term "jock" is used in its sense of "stereotypical athlete," although websites constituent of the Anti-jock Movement often use the term to distinguish negative or excessive interest in sports, from common or positive athletic endeavor. The stereotypical athlete can be defined as an individual who uses his or her athletic ability or abilities in an effort to gain social capital. His or her identity is intertwined with their athletic endeavor and as a result they are unable to connect with individuals who do not participate in athletics. In the decade following the year 2000, increasing recognition has been given to the existence of a movement consisting of "a group of self-described marginalized youth [who] constructed and sustained anti-jock websites, where they articulated 'dissatisfaction with and anger toward institutions that uncritically adulate hyper-masculine/high contact sport culture and the athletes who are part of this culture (i.e., the ‘jocks’)'”. This "group of self-described marginalized youth" identify with the individuals who feel as though they have been marginalized by "stereotypical athlete". As a whole, the group of young people who created the anti-jock cyber movement were not students who participated in athletics. The anti-jock cyber-movement was created as support to those who feel as though they have been tormented by the 'jocks' and was initially created as a support group. As the anti-jock movement gained support, it took on a more negative perspective against the "stereotypical athlete". Such has been cited as an act of resistance against the dominant media and cultural paradigm.

Recognition 
One of the most cited articles giving recognition to the existence of an anti-jock cyber movement is a 2002 article published by Brian Wilson (an assistant professor of Cultural Studies and Sociology, University of British Columbia) in the Sociology of Sport Journal, titled "The 'Anti-Jock' Movement: Reconsidering Youth Resistance, Masculinity and Sport Culture in the Age of the Internet". In the course of the article, Wilson described the movement as follows:
The anti-jock movement is group of self-described "marginalized youth" who, through the production and consumption of anti-jock Websites, express dissatisfaction with and anger toward institutions that uncritically adulate hyper-masculine/high-contact sport culture and the athletes who are part of this culture (i.e. the "jocks"). Through these Websites, strategies of resistance against the "pro-jock" establishment are offered.
After analyzing the content of various "Anti-Jock" websites, Wilson concluded that
In one sense, the anti-jock Websites can be viewed, together, as a new social movement according to Harvey and Houle's definition. That is to say, they are not linked to specific economic interests, they are working toward change in society's (pro-jock) values, and (arguably), anti-jocks are working toward a better society where males and females are nor subject to the domination of the interests of a masculinist sport culture and jocks.
Since its 2002 publication, Wilson's article has been often cited with reference to the existence of the Anti-Jock Movement.

Constituent websites 

Professor Brian Wilson, in his article "The 'Anti-Jock' Movement: Reconsidering Youth Resistance, Masculinity and Sport Culture in the Age of the Internet", detailed two basic types of websites which are common within the Anti-Jock cyber movement.

First, webzines devoted to opposition of the jock culture. These sites often include suggestions for activism and action against the jock establishment. Professor Wilson, referred specifically to two such sites: Spoilsports, and the now defunct High School Underground. There are however, other such sites, such as the International I Hate Sports Club, which have similar objectives and content.

Second, there are personal websites, consisting of personal rants criticizing the jock establishment, "personal interest" websites which include personal concerns which include criticism about jock culture, and third, personal sites that devote themselves exclusively to anti-jock statements. A large part of the anti-jock movement began as a result of specific individuals who felt marginalized by stereotypical athletes and used the internet to voice their frustrations. In turn, other individuals who were experiencing the same frustrations found support within this cyber-movement.

See also 
Sociology of sport

References 

 James L. Shulman & William G. Bowen. (2007) The Game of Life: College Sports and Educational Values

External links 
 The International I Hate Sports Club
Spoil Sports
 High School Underground (from archive)
 Anti-Jock Purple Ribbon Campaign
 Article:Wilson, Brian. (2002). The “Anti-Jock” Movement: Reconsidering Youth Resistance, Masculinity and Sport Culture in the Age of the Internet. Sociology of Sport Journal, 19(2), 207-234.
Article: Stack, M., & Kelly, D. M. (2006). The Popular Media, Education, and Resistance. Canadian Journal of Education, 29(1), 5-26.

Nerd culture
Criticism of sports
Sports culture
Anti-bullying campaigns